Transformers: Dark of the Moon – The Album is a compilation album of various artists music from the 2011 live-action Transformers: Dark of the Moon film. The first official single from the album is the radio edit version of "Iridescent" by Linkin Park. The second single released for the film is "Monster" by Paramore. The third single released for the film is "All That You Are" by Goo Goo Dolls. The score was released digitally 10 days after the album. U2 song North Star was used in the movie.

Track listing

Usage in the film
Despite the numerous songs contributed to the soundtrack, only four songs from the album are used in the film. "All That You Are" is played during the scene where Shia LaBeouf's character Sam Witwicky is at work. U2's "North Star" is briefly played at the start of the scene where Sam Witwicky visits his girlfriend's office. "Iridescent"'s intro is played during the scene when Sam rides through the devastated Chicago city. "Iridescent", "Monster" and "Many of Horror" are used at the end credits.

Reception
Chad Grischow of IGN gave a favorable review of the album, saying the album has "few too many tracks here you likely have lurking elsewhere on your iPod and not enough new treats to wholly recommend" but assures the listener "will definitely find pieces here worth saving from the scrap heap."

References

External links
 Official Album Website (Invalid link)
 Official Movie Website

Dark of the Moon – The Album
2011 soundtrack albums
2010s film soundtrack albums